Bissa, Burkina Faso may refer to:
Bissa, Balé
Bissa, Bam